GSP Belgrade is a public transit company in the city of Belgrade. As of 2018, it operates with 170 lines and has 1,611 active vehicles.

Name
The acronym "GSP" stands for Gradsko saobraćajno preduzeće.

History
Its history dates back to 14 October 1892 when the first horse tram line began operating in Belgrade between Slavija and Terazije. It was known under the name Beogradska varoška železnica. The first bus line was opened in 1925 and in 1947 the first trolleybuses appeared in Belgrade.

1940–1990
In 1940, the tram traffic took place on 10 lines. Belgrade has disposed of 104 trams, 60 trailers and 87 buses. The following year, in the bombing of Belgrade was destroyed 38 trams, 36 trailers and 10 buses. In 1945, company changed its name to the Department of traffic lights and the Executive Committee of the City of Belgrade. In Belgrade Radio 4 tram and bus lines 3 with a total of 58 vehicles. In 1947, the first trolley was introduced to the line Kalemegdan – Slavija.

In 1955, in Belgrade was 8 tram lines with 162 trams, three trolley lines with 42 trolley buses and 14 bus routes with 148 buses. In 1956, he was released into operation first trolleybus domestic production - "Goša FOM". Belgrade and Zemun are associated trolley lines. As of 1960, there was 38 lines (7 tram, 6 trolleybus and 14 bus). Number of vehicles in inventory stood at 467. In 1961, 160 Leyland buses were purchased.

In 1962, cab vehicles were introduced, a total of 63 vehicles. In 1970, 144 new vehicles were purchased for the transport of Belgrade. The total number of vehicles has increased to 806. In 1975, new zonal tariff system was introduced and number of vehicles rose to 995. By 1985, the total number of vehicles was 1380, and the average number of vehicles in traffic in operation was, on weekdays was 779. In 1989, an integrated system of unified tariff system, in addition to Lasta and GSP in the system is turned on and ZTP Beograd and ATP Pancevo.

1990–2000
By the decision of the Assembly of Belgrade, GSP "Belgrade" in 1990 became a public utility company, founded by the city. In 1991, with a total of 1,393 vehicles, with average age of 4.5 years, the streets of Belgrade was at the peak was about 1,130 vehicles a day carrying about 2.5 million passengers. The crisis in the former Yugoslavia, which escalated in the second half of 1991, led to the introduction of economic sanctions by UN Security Council to Federal Republic of Yugoslavia, and the influx of a large number of displaced persons in Belgrade. Investments in the purchase of new vehicles, spare parts and maintenance of the infrastructure was minimal. During 1993, due to the inability of continuous maintenance of the public transport problems in the procurement of oil and tires, price growth, transport declined in the number of vehicles in traffic, so that at the end of the year only 400 vehicles were in operation. Some lines were eliminated or shortened. The function of public transport in Belgrade had been damaged.

During 1994 and 1995, the GSP managed to raise the level of transportation, revitalize the fleet to an average of 909 vehicles on weekdays. At the beginning of 1998, in public transport private transporters were included. Compared to the previous year, it had 127 vehicles less, along with a tendency of further decline. The unified tariff system ceased to existand passed on ticketing in vehicles by the conductor. After the start of NATO bombing of Yugoslavia on 24 March 1999, GSP "Beograd" transferred to work in the war environment, which meant the abolition or curtailment of a large number of lines. In the aftermath of the NATO bombing, the problem was lack of vehicles. The unfavorable situation continued in 2000. The outdated fleet, low technical condition of vehicles, lack of spare parts, frequent reduction of traffic due to fuel shortages are only part of the problem that led to the introduction of emergency measures by the Republic government. Significant changes have taken place after the events of October 2000, when the city's new government has opted for the revitalization of the GSP, as a holder of public transport system in Belgrade. A goal that was set before GSP "Belgrade" was to reach the level of the enterprise from the beginning of the 1990s. By the end of the year, most of former lines were reestablished.

2011–present

In 2011, GSP Belgrade began with the acquisition of new CAF Urbos 3 trams. By the end of 2012, it supplied 30 trams of this model. The new trams are commonly referred to as Španac (Spaniard) by Belgrade's residents.

GSP Belgrade introduced BusPlus on 1 February 2012. BusPlus is an electronic payment method where commuters load fares on a thin plastic card. Also, the private carriers were introduced and integrated in tariff system – Integrated Tariff System (ITS). There are 145 lines, out of which 12 are tram, 8 are trolleybus and 125 are bus lines. Service operates daily between 4am and midnight, with a limited night bus system. GSP also operates school bus lines, and transportation for the disabled. The entire traffic grid is divided in two zones.

As of 2017, GSP Belgrade has 1,582 vehicles in operation. Most of GSP's revenue is still generated through subsidies by the city of Belgrade; in 2017, that amount stood at 65 million euros.

In April 2019, GSP along with the city of Belgrade signed a contract to purchase 244 new buses, of which 70 are manufactured by Turkish BMC and 174 by Chinese Higer.

In october 2021, GSP signed a contract to purchase 100 CNG buses with Turkish BMC.

Vehicle coloring
Until the beginning of the 1960s, the vehicles have been colored by cream and red color scheme (buses have been colored until 1961. trolleybuses and trams are colored until 1964). From the beginning of the 1960s, the vehicles have been colored by Mussolini livery – light and dark green color scheme (for buses from 1961 to 1967, for trolleybuses and trams from 1964 to 1970).

From the end of the 1960s, the vehicles have been colored by cream and green color scheme (for trams and trolleybuses from 1970 to 1979, for buses from 1967 to 1987). From the end of the 1970s, the vehicles have been colored by cream and red color scheme again (for trams and trolleybuses from 1979 to 2003, for buses from 1987 to 2004).

From the beginning of 2000s, the vehicles are coloring by three color schemes with blue bottom (trams are colored by red and blue color scheme from 2002, trolleybuses are colored by orange and blue color scheme from 2003 (for some units, but their current color scheme is red from 2010), and buses are colored by yellow and blue color scheme from 2004 (in future, their color scheme will be red from 2015)). Some vehicles have been colored by cream and blue color scheme (like the private buses in the end of the 1990s, for example: one trolleybus ZiU-9 and one tram ČKD-Tatra KT4YU have been colored in cream and blue color scheme in 1993 (in collaboration with Mašinska Industrija Niš - MIN), and two trams ČKD-Tatra KT4YU have been coloured in cream and blue colour scheme in 2001).

Vehicle fleet

Current fleet

Buses

BMC
Procity 12 – solo
Procity 18 – articulated
Higer
KLQ6129GQ2
KLQ6129GEV2 - electric
KLQ6129GEV3 - electric
Ikarbus
IK-101 (from 1997) – solo
IK-103 (from 1998) – solo
IK-106 (from 1997) – solo
IK-112.3 (from 2006) – solo
IK-112N (from 2008) – solo
IK-112LE (from 2015) - solo
IK-112M (from 2016) - solo

IK-201 (from 1997) – articulated
IK-202 (from 1998) – articulated
IK-203 (from 1999) – articulated
IK-218 (from 2011) – articulated
IK-218.3 (from 2007) – articulated
IK-218N (from 2009) – articulated
IK-218M (from 2012) – articulated
Mercedes-Benz
O305 – donation from Berlin (Germany) (from 1997) – solo
O345 Conecto (from 2003) – solo
MAN
SG313 – donation from Japan (from 2003) – articulated
SL283 – donation from Japan (from 2003) – solo
MAZ/BIK
BIK-203 CNG (from 2010) – solo
Solaris
Urbino 18 (from 2013) – articulated

Trolleybuses
ZiU/TrolZa
TrolZa-62052.01 (from 2000) – articulated
Belkommunmash
AKSM-321.00S (from 2005) – solo
AKSM-333.04 (from 2004) – articulated

Trams
ČKD Tatra
Tatra KT4YUB/YUBM (from 1980) – articulated
Duewag
GT6 (Be 4/6) – donation from Basel (Switzerland) (from 2001) – articulated
CAF
CAF Urbos 3 (from 2011) – low floor articulated
Unique trams
Čičica – originally remaining Đuro Đaković TMK 101 (from 1994) – solo
ČKD T4D – donation from Halle (Germany) (from 2002) – solo
SWP Be 4/4 – donation from Basel (Switzerland) (from 2001) – solo

Vehicles used in the past

Buses
Past buses
Mercedes-Benz O317K FAS "11 Oktomvri" Skoplje (1973–1990) – solo – 17 years
Mercedes-Benz O305G (2000–2003) – donation from Germany – articulated – 3 years
Mercedes-Benz O405 (2000-2019) - donation from Germany - solo - 19 years
Mercedes-Benz O405N (2000-2017) - donation from Germany - solo - 17 years
Mercedes-Benz O405G (2000–2012) – donation from Germany – articulated – 12 years
FAS-Sanos S115 (1987–2012) – solo – 25 years
FAS-Sanos S200 (2000–2003) – donation from Ljubljana (Slovenia) – articulated – 3 years
MAN Avtomontaža 890 UO (1974–1986) – solo – 12 years
MAN Avtomontaža 890 UG (1970–1981) – articulated – 11 years
MAN 890 UO Ikarus Zemun IK-6B (1970–1987) – solo – 18 years
MAN 890 UG Ikarus Zemun IK-5B (1975–1994) – articulated – 19 years
MAN Avtomontaža SU 220 (1981–2008) – solo – 27 years
MAN Avtomontaža SG 220 (1987–2003) – articulated – 16 years
Ikarus IK-4B (1971–1990) – solo – 19 years
Ikarus IK-105B (1982–2000) – solo – 18 years
Ikarus IK-102 (1988–2014) – solo – 24 years
Ikarus IK-110B (1984–2013) – solo – 29 years
Ikarus IK-111B (1989–2017) - solo - 20 years
Ikarus IK-111 (1990–2000) – donation from Timișoara (Romania) – solo – 10 years
Ikarus IK-160B (1984–2013) – articulated – 28 years
Ikarus IK-161 (1986–2014) – articulated – 28 years
Ikarus IK-166 (1991–2014) – articulated – 23 years
Ikarus IK-166 (1994–2013) – donation from Istanbul (Turkey) – articulated – 19 years
Ikarus IK-167 (1990–2003) – articulated – 13 years
FAP-Leyland Kokarus (1963–1982) – solo – 19 years
FAP G100 (1965–1981) – solo – 16 years
FAP G160 (1967–1980) – articulated – 13 years
FAP A537 (2002–2020) – solo – 18 years
TAM AS 3500 (1968–1981) – solo – 13 years
Leyland Worldmaster (1961–1977) – solo – 16 years
MAN NL202 (2000–2013) – donation from Germany – solo – 13 years 
Fiat Iveco (2000–2009) – donation from Trieste (Italy) – solo – 9 years
Graf-Stift GU 230 (2000–2004) – donation from Austria – articulated – 4 years 
Ikarus 260 (2000–2002) – donation from Greece – solo – 2 years
Karosa B932E (2000-2020) - donation from Czech Republic - solo - 20 years

Trolleybuses
Past trolleybuses
Alfa Romeo / Goša (1962–1984) – solo – 22 years
Goša Fages (1956–1981) – solo – 25 years
Goša Prototype (1987–1995) – solo – 8 years
Fiat CGE (1949–1980) – solo – 31 years
Tatra T400 (1947–1961) – solo – 14 years
ZiU 9 (1979–2012) – solo – 33 years
ZiU 682G (1989–2015) - solo - 26 years
ZiU 682B-10 (2005–2010) – donation from Athens (Greece) – solo – 5 years
Trolza 5275-05 (2003–2010) – solo – 7 years
VMZ 5298(375) (2000–2010) – solo – 10 years
Belkommunmash AKSM 201.01 (2001–2016) - solo – 15 years
Graf-Stift OE112 M11 (2001–2007) – donation from Austria – solo – 6 years
Graf-Stift OE112 M16 (2001–2010) – donation from Austria – articulated – 9 years

Trams
Past trams
Đuro Đaković TMK 101 (1964–1980) – solo – 16 years
Đuro Đaković TMK 201 Prototype (1967–1983) – solo – 16 years
Đuro Đaković TMK 201 (1970–1991) – solo – 21 years
ČKD Tatra T4D Prototype (1967–1983) – solo – 16 years
ČKD Tatra T4YUB (1972–1991) – solo – 19 years
Breda I (1940–1970) – solo – 30 years
Breda II (1949–1974) – solo – 25 years
Breda III 5300 (1960–1985) – solo – 25 years
PCC I (700) – from Belgium (1952–1981) – solo – 29 years
PCC II (B6) – from Belgium (1960–1985) – solo – 25 years
Jasenica – from Goša or Đuro Đaković (1936–1980) – solo – 44 years
Duewag T4 – Hagen (1977–1986) – solo (bi-directional) – 9 years
Duewag GT6 – Hagen (1978–1987) – articulated (bi-directional) – 9 years
Goša (1956–1968) – solo – 12 years
MAN-Siemens Shuckert (1923–1960) – solo – 37 years
AEG (1923–1971) – solo – 48 years
Škoda / Kolben Ringhofer (1927–1967) – solo – 40 years
BBC – Brown, Boveri & Cie (1927–1964) – solo – 37 years

References

External links
 
 

1892 establishments in Serbia
Companies based in Belgrade
Public transport in Serbia
Public transport operators
Transport companies established in 1892
Transport companies of Serbia
Transport in Belgrade